The list of shipwrecks in January 1829 includes some ships sunk, wrecked or otherwise lost during January 1829.

1 January

2 January

3 January

4 January

5 January

6 January

7 January

8 January

9 January

10 January

11 January

12 January

15 January

17 January

22 January

23 January

24 January

25 January

26 January

27 January

28 January

29 January

30 January

Unknown date

References

1829-01